Nikos Kazantzakis (Νίκος Καζαντζάκης) may refer to:
 Nikos Kazantzakis (1883–1957), Greek writer
 Nikos Kazantzakis (municipality), former municipality in the Heraklion regional unit, Crete, Greece
 Heraklion International Airport "Nikos Kazantzakis" (IATA: HER, ICAO: LGIR), primary airport on the island of Crete, Greece